Steve Lawrence (born 1935) is an American actor and singer whose career started in the 1950s.

Steve Lawrence may also refer to:

 Steve Lawrence (computer scientist), Australian computer scientist who works mainly on internet search engines
 Steve Lawrence, bassist with bands including the Phantom Chords
 Steve Lawrence (cyclist) (born 1955), British racing cyclist

See also
Steven Lawrence (born 1976), Australian footballer
Stephen Laurence, scientist and philosopher
Stephen Lawrence (disambiguation)